Aleksandr Anatolyevich Malyshev (born 8 January 1980) is a Russian professional football coach and a former player. He works as goalkeeping coach with FC Volgar Astrakhan.

Club career
He made his debut in the Russian Premier League in 2004 for FC Shinnik Yaroslavl and played 3 games in the UEFA Intertoto Cup 2004 for them.

References

Russian footballers
Association football goalkeepers
FC Shinnik Yaroslavl players
FC Ural Yekaterinburg players
1980 births
Living people
Russian Premier League players
FC Rotor Volgograd players
Footballers from Yaroslavl
FC Dynamo Vologda players